Brandon George Rogers (born August 3, 1988) is an American YouTuber, actor and comedian. He plays many characters in his eponymous YouTube channel and co-wrote the adult animated web series Helluva Boss, in which he voices the main character Blitzø.

Career
Rogers began creating videos for his job in Los Angeles at a personal-injury law firm where he made documentaries that were shot by Gabriel Gonzales on the daily life of plaintiffs that were used in court. He had the idea to make humorous versions of these documentaries with Gonzales and started his YouTube channel on January 7, 2006 as "HotBananaStud." Rogers first gained recognition in 2015 when a Vine user uploaded six-second clips of his videos in uncredited roles. After a clip from one of his videos went viral on Vine and it was featured on Fine Brothers Entertainment's React series, the original creator of the video became publicly known, and Rogers gained online fame.

In 2016, Super Deluxe offered to produce a show for Rogers. The show, Magic Funhouse! was available on Fullscreen's short-lived subscription service and was the service’s most watched original show. Magic Funhouse! was nominated for Best Comedy Series at the 7th Annual Streamy Awards. In 2017, Rogers was named a New Face: Creator at the Just for Laughs Comedy Festival. In addition to co-hosting the event, he was nominated for four awards and won the awards for Scripted Series and Acting at the 9th Annual Streamy Awards for his web series Blame the Hero. In 2018, Rogers was a 10th Annual Shorty Awards finalist for the Best Youtube Comedian award. Rogers collaborated with Comedy Central in 2019 for their "Under the Influencer" program which had him take over the company's social media platforms for a week.

Personal life
Rogers is from Livermore, California, and is of Portuguese, Filipino, Scottish and Spanish descent. Rogers describes his hometown as conservative, but his parents were very liberal. His mother is an accountant and his father works for Cisco. He has two younger siblings. Rogers is gay. He is an ordained minister.

Filmography

Awards and nominations

References

External links
 
 

Living people
1988 births
American people of Portuguese descent
American people of Filipino descent
American people of British descent
American people of Spanish descent
American male voice actors
American YouTubers
Comedy YouTubers
American gay actors
American gay writers
LGBT YouTubers
People from Livermore, California
American Christians
20th-century LGBT people
21st-century LGBT people
YouTube channels launched in 2006
Comedy-related YouTube channels
LGBT TikTokers